The Secret Cinema is a short black-and-white film produced, written, and directed by Paul Bartel, and released in 1966, gaining somewhat wider distribution in 1968. The film is about a woman who is manipulated by people around her so a director can film her to screen the results in a theater. The film is described as voyeuristic or surveillance film, though obviously staged.

Plot summary
Jane (Amy Vane) is a secretary whose daily activities are being secretly filmed, with the knowledge and assistance of those who are closest to her. She's sexually harassed by her corpulent boss, Mr. Troppogrosso (Gordon Felio), humiliated by her boyfriend, given the gaslight treatment by the people around her, etc. The film is then shown in theaters. She is starting to suspect that something isn't quite right.

Notes
 In 1986, Paul Bartel remade the film as an episode of Amazing Stories (season 1, episode 20), in which Bartel also played the part of the psychiatrist Dr. Shreck.
 This film has been released on videocassette by Rhino Entertainment, packaged with a 7-minute erotic short entitled The Naughty Nurse.
 In 1998, the premise of someone's life being secretly filmed was used in The Truman Show.
 In 2012 The Secret Cinema, along with The Naughty Nurse, was released as a bonus feature on The Criterion Collection's DVD and Blu-ray releases of Eating Raoul.
 In 2017, The Secret Cinema was restored by the Academy Film Archive and The Film Foundation with funding provided by the George Lucas Family Foundation.

See also
List of American films of 1966
List of films featuring surveillance

References

External links

1966 films
American short films
American black-and-white films
Films directed by Paul Bartel
1960s English-language films